The Busan–Gimhae Light Rail Transit is a light metro system between the cities of Busan and Gimhae in South Korea. The line has 21 stations including Daejeo and Sasang where passengers can transfer to Busan Metro Line 3 and Line 2 respectively. The line thus acts as a connecting rail between both Gimhae and Busan International Airport with two western outreaches of the Busan Metro system.

Construction

Construction of the line started in February 2006, and after repeated delays, it was set to open on 29 July 2011; however, opening of the line was once postponed indefinitely due to noise abatement issues.  The line finally opened on 9 September 2011 with one week of free service; revenue service began on 17 September 2011.

The line is a joint venture between POSCO and Hyundai Rotem, and has a budget of 9,738 billion won.  The line is fully automated and uses standard gauge.

Signalling
The Busan–Gimhae Light Rail Transit is currently equipped with Thales SelTrac Communications-based train control (CBTC) moving block signalling system.

Rolling stock
The line uses a dedicated fleet of 2-car trains built by Rotem, a member of Hyundai Motor Group.

Stations
The line includes Gimhae International Airport Station. This is the station for Busan International Airport.

The stations at Sasang and Daejoe each connect with another line in the Busan urban rail network. Sasang connects with line 2 (green). Daejoe connects with line 3 (red).

References

External links
 Busan-Gimhae Light Rail Transit Co. Ltd. homepage

 
Gimhae
Transport in Busan
Airport rail links in South Korea
Busan Metro lines
Light rail in South Korea